Arthur Lee (20 December 1740 – 12 December 1792) was a physician and opponent of slavery in colonial Virginia in North America who served as an American diplomat during the American Revolutionary War. He helped negotiate and signed the 1778 Treaty of Alliance with France, along with Benjamin Franklin and Silas Deane, which allied France and the United States in fighting the war. 

Lee was educated in medicine and law at the University of Edinburgh and in London, respectively. After passing the bar, he practiced law in London for several years. He stayed in London during the Revolutionary War, representing the colonies to Britain and France and also serving as an American spy to track their activities. After his return to Virginia, he served as a delegate to the Continental Congress.

Life
Born at Stratford Hall, Virginia, Arthur Lee was the youngest son of Hon. Thomas Lee (1690–1750) and Hannah Harrison Ludwell (1701–1750). Three of his five surviving elder brothers, Richard Henry Lee (1732–1794), Francis Lightfoot Lee (1734–1797) and William Lee (1739–1795), also became Revolutionary-era diplomats.

He attended Eton College in England and studied medicine at the University of Edinburgh, where he graduated in 1764. The title description of his thesis is: Dissertatio medica inauguralis, de cortice peruviano: quam ... ex auctoritate ... Gulielmi Robertson ... Academiae Edinburgenae praefecti ... pro gradu doctoratus ... eruditorum examini subjicit, Arthur Lee, Virginiensis. Ad diem septembris [1764] ... – Edinburgi : in aedibus A. Donaldson et J. Reid, MDCCLXIV. – 2 p. l., 47 p. ; 20 cm. on 13 May 1765 he matriculated at the University of Leiden in the Netherlands.

During the latter period, Lee wrote in 1764, "An Essay in Vindication of the Continental Colonies of America," one of his more noted works. He opposed the Townshend Acts and became a major proponent of American resistance to the British. After this work, he was granted membership to the American Philosophical Society through his election in 1768.

He studied law in London, passing the bar, and practising there from 1770 to 1776. During this time in London, Lee wrote many influential pamphlets and essays opposing slavery and British continental policies. He lived at Poland Street with Paul Wentworth (counsellor)  for five years.

In 1770, Lee in London was named as the Massachusetts correspondent to Britain and France. He began corresponding with Samuel Adams, which began a long friendship. They probably did not meet personally until sometime after 1780. Lee met Benjamin Franklin while he was in London, where Franklin was negotiating on behalf of Pennsylvania interests. Lee criticized Franklin's extravagant lifestyle and told Sam Adams he would never be a good negotiator between a free people and a tyrant.

In May 1776, he was a guest at the dinner organized by James Boswell that brought together Samuel Johnson, an ardent opponent of the American colonists' cause, and John Wilkes, one of its most prominent British supporters. 
 
During the American Revolution, the Continental Congress appointed Lee as its envoy to Spain and Prussia, but his success was at best mixed. 

In November 1775, the committee of secret correspondence of the Second Continental Congress asked Lee to become its confidential correspondent in London, where during his diplomatic career he frequently aired suspicions upon the various men who had appointed him along with some of his colleges. Arguably Lee was one of America's first spies. He gathered information in France and Britain. He also successfully identified Edward Bancroft, secretary to the American legation in Paris, as a British spy.

Later, in Paris, after Lee helped negotiate the Treaty of Alliance (1778) with France, he fell out with Benjamin Franklin and Silas Deane. He persuaded Congress to recall Deane to America, but he was himself recalled soon afterward. Have earned a reputation of being overly suspicious where, Franklin, in a letter of April 3, 1778 chided him in that if he let these feelings dominate his life that he would end up insane.

After Lee returned to Virginia, the state in 1782 sent him as a delegate to the Continental Congress. The same year he was elected a Fellow of the American Academy of Arts and Sciences.

In 1790, Arthur Lee purchased Lansdowne from Robert Wormeley III. This fine mansion still stands in Urbanna, a small waterfront town on Virginia's Middle Peninsula.  It is presently a private residence. Lee died at Urbanna in 1792 and was buried in the rear garden with no stone. He never married and had no children. Plans to reinter him at Stratford Hall never came about. Lansdowne was listed on the National Register of Historic Places in 1974.

Ancestry

Arthur Lee was the son of Colonel Thomas Lee, Hon. (1690–1750) of Stratford Hall Plantation, Westmoreland County, Virginia.  Thomas married Hannah Harrison Ludwell (1701–1750), the daughter of Colonel Philip Ludwell II (1672–1726) of Green Spring Plantation, and Hannah Harrison (1679–1731).

Arthur's father, Thomas, was the son of Colonel Richard Lee II, Esq., known as  "Richard the Scholar" (1647–1715) and Laetitia Corbin (c. 1657 – 1706). Richard Lee II, was the son of Col. Richard Lee I, Esq., known as "The Immigrant" (1618–1664) and Anne Constable (c. 1621 – 1666).

Arthur's paternal grandmother, Laetitia, was the daughter of the Lees' neighbor and councillor (attorney), Hon. Henry Corbin, Sr. (1629–1676) and Alice (Eltonhead) Burnham (c. 1627 – 1684).

Arthur's paternal great-grandmother, Anne, was the daughter of Thomas Constable; she became a ward of Sir John Thoroughgood.

References

Sources

Further reading

External links
 The Diplomatic Correspondence of the American Revolution, published by an Act of Congress in 1818 and edited by Jared Sparks, includes much correspondence by and to Arthur Lee

1740 births
1792 deaths
Ambassadors of the United States to France
Continental Congressmen from Virginia
18th-century American politicians
Arthur
American people of English descent
American abolitionists
Fellows of the American Academy of Arts and Sciences
Fellows of the Royal Society
Alumni of the University of Edinburgh
Leiden University alumni
People from Urbanna, Virginia